Shrinkwrapped may refer to:
An item covered in shrink wrap
""Shrinkwrapped"", a track from Shrinkwrapped (album) by English band Gang of Four
"Shrink-Wrapped", an episode of the American TV series Law & Order: Criminal Intent

See also
Shrink wrap (disambiguation)
Plastic wrap
Stretch wrap